"Unexpected Song" is a 1984 song from the musical Song and Dance originally sung (on Broadway) by Bernadette Peters. The music was written by Andrew Lloyd Webber, with lyrics by Don Black. It is one of Lloyd Webber's most frequently performed compositions.

Background
The music for "Unexpected Song" originates from Lloyd Webber's instrumental album Variations, much of which became the dance music in the second half of Lloyd Webber's musical Song and Dance. Black wrote lyrics to one of the tracks, "Variation 5," which became "Unexpected Song." The song was released by Marti Webb and Justin Hayward as a duet in 1981. Later, Black wrote new lyrics to the melody and retitled the song "When You Want to Fall in Love." The original lyrics were re-instated when the show was re-written for Sarah Brightman's run. Brightman released the song as a single in 1984.

"Unexpected Song" was later used in Lloyd Webber's and Black's reworking of the show, returning to the original album title of Tell Me on a Sunday.

Composition
"Unexpected Song" is a ballad.

Chart performance
Brightman's single peaked at #76 on the UK Singles Chart.

Track listing 
 "Unexpected Song" 
 "Come Back With the Same Look in Your Eyes"

Covers 
 Bernadette Peters on Song & Dance: Original Broadway Cast Recording (1985)
 Michael Crawford on Songs From the Stage & Screen (1987)
 Paul Jones on The Andrew Lloyd Webber Collection (1991)
 Clare Burt on Aspects of Andrew Lloyd Webber Volume 2 (1996)
 Michael Ball on Julian Lloyd Webber's Unexpected Songs (2006)
 Anthony Warlow on Best of Act One
 Denise Van Outen on Tell Me On a Sunday (2006)
 Myrra Malmberg on Unexpected: Myrra Malmberg Sings Lloyd Webber (1997)
 Dave Willetts on The Musicals Unplugged (2003)
 Marie Osmond on Unexpected (2021)

References

1984 singles
Songs from musicals
Sarah Brightman songs
Songs with music by Andrew Lloyd Webber
Songs with lyrics by Don Black (lyricist)
1984 songs